Pilgrim Nuclear Power Station (PNPS) is a decommissioned nuclear power plant in Massachusetts in the Manomet section of Plymouth on Cape Cod Bay, south of the tip of Rocky Point and north of Priscilla Beach. Like many similar plants, it was constructed by Bechtel, and was powered by a General Electric BWR 3 boiling water reactor inside of a Mark 1 pressure suppression type containment and generator. With a 690 MW production capacity, it produced about 14% of the electricity generated in Massachusetts.

On October 13, 2015, the plant's owners announced that it would close by June 1, 2019, citing "market conditions and increased costs," which would have included tens of millions of dollars of necessary safety upgrades.

History
Built at a cost of $231 million in 1972 by Boston Edison, the plant was sold in 1999 to the Louisiana-based Entergy Corporation, part of a complex deal that was the result of deregulation of the electrical utility industry.

On April 11, 1986, a recurring equipment problem forced an emergency shutdown of the plant. The US Nuclear Regulatory Commission (NRC) called it ″one of the worst-run″ nuclear plants in the country. 

Pilgrim kept its spent nuclear fuel in an on-site storage pool, waiting for federal direction on the correct disposal process. The Yucca Mountain site in Nevada was being considered for this purpose until its deselection in 2009.

Pilgrim's original license to operate would have expired in 2012. In 2006, Entergy filed an application for an extended operating license (until 2032) with the NRC. In May 2012, the NRC approved the 20-year extension, with chairman Gregory Jaczko the lone dissenting vote.

Opposition to Pilgrim's license extension came mainly from Pilgrim Watch, a local group which filed numerous legal and procedural challenges. The state attorney general also raised questions about, among other issues, the dangers posed by the onsite storage of spent nuclear fuel.

In April 2013, the station increased its security following the Boston Marathon bombing.

In July 2013, the plant had to reduce output during a heat wave despite very high electricity demand, because the temperature of water drawn from Cape Cod Bay exceeded 75 °F, the limit set by the NRC.

On August 22, 2013, with the plant online at 98% power, two of the plant's main feedwater pumps tripped, causing a drop of the reactor water level. Operators inserted a manual SCRAM to shutdown the reactor prior to the third feedwater pump subsequently tripping. The loss of feedwater and sudden trip from the high power level caused the reactor water level to drop below -46 inches. After passing this point, the emergency core cooling system automatically activated. Operators using the RCIC and HPCI systems promptly restored the reactor water level to normal. Ironically, it was found that the pumps were tripped due to a design flaw in a recent SCRAM reduction program intended to make the pumps less likely to trip. Quick action by the operators prevented a more serious low-water incident. It was the first time in the station's history that reactor water level reached a low-low condition and activated emergency core cooling systems. 

On January 27, 2015, the plant underwent a storm-induced unplanned shutdown.

The plant was shut down May 31, 2019 and began the process of decommissioning.

Electricity Production

Surrounding population

In 2010, 75,835 people lived within  of Pilgrim, an increase of 40.5% in a decade (according to an analysis of U.S. Census data for msnbc.com). 4,737,792 people lived within 50 miles (80 km), an increase of 10.2% since 2000. Cities within 50 miles included Boston (35 miles to city center).

Environmental impacts on Cape Cod Bay

PNPS operated a single reactor unit with a boiling water reactor and a steam turbine generator. The cooling and service water systems operated as a once-through cooling system, with Cape Cod Bay being the water source. The water was circulated in the plant's heat exchanger in the same manner as any fossil-fuel powered power plant, using the seawater to remove heat from primary coolant away from sources of radioactive contamination. Approximately 480 million gallons of seawater were withdrawn daily from the bay through an intake embayment formed by two breakwaters, and then re-deposited into the bay causing a change in temperature at peak times (ΔT) of 3 °C (5.4 °F).

During that process, the greatest environmental impact to the bay occurred through impingement and entrainment (I&E) of sea organisms and species. Entrainment occurs when small aquatic life forms are carried into and through the cooling system during water withdrawals. Impingement occurs when organisms are trapped against cooling water intake screens or racks by force of moving water.

PNPS has been regularly monitoring I&E levels since 1974. They have reported I&E losses of millions of aquatic organisms each year. The EPA evaluated all species known to be impinged and entrained by the facility, including commercial, recreational, and forage fish species.  Based on information provided in facility I&E monitoring reports, approximately 68 species have been identified in I&E collections since 1974, and 26 of these have commercial or recreational value.

During the license renewal process, the Nuclear Regulatory Commission found that the significance of the potential environmental impacts of renewal would be small, with the exception of marine aquatic resources. Due to I&E, the continued operation of the cooling water system would rarely have impact on the local winter flounder (Pseudopleuronectes americanus) population, and the Jones River population of rainbow smelt, and cumulative impacts on other marine aquatic species would be small to moderate.

After the aquatic organisms were impinged into the cooling system, they were discharged back into the bay as sediment. The resulting shadow effect killed plant and animal life around reactor discharge systems by curtailing the light and oxygen they need to survive; however, the intake and discharge canals remained a popular and lucrative local recreational fishing spot for local residents.

Seismic risk
The NRC's estimate of the yearly risk of an earthquake strong enough to cause core damage to the Pilgrim reactor was 1 in 14,493, according to their study published in August 2010, making it the second-most-at-risk plant when it was still operating.

Notes

External links 

DoE Page
Entergy Nuclear
Official Website of Pilgrim Power Station
History of Pilgrim Power Station

Energy infrastructure completed in 1972
Buildings and structures in Plymouth, Massachusetts
Nuclear power plants in Massachusetts
Entergy
Former nuclear power stations in the United States
1972 establishments in Massachusetts
2019 disestablishments in Massachusetts